Chaudhry Riaz-ul-Haq is a Pakistani politician who has been a member of the National Assembly of Pakistan, since August 2018. Previously he was a member of the National Assembly from November 2015 to May 2018.

Political career

He was elected to the National Assembly of Pakistan as an independent candidate from Constituency NA-144 (Okara-II) in by-elections held in 2015. He received 85,714 votes and defeated Ali Arif Chaudhry, a candidate of Pakistan Muslim League (N) (PML-N). In November 2015, he joined PML-N.

He was re-elected to the National Assembly as a candidate of PML-N from Constituency NA-142 (Okara-II) in 2018 Pakistani general election.

References

Living people
Year of birth missing (living people)
Punjabi people
Pakistani MNAs 2013–2018
Pakistan Muslim League (N) politicians
Pakistani MNAs 2018–2023